Digital footprint or digital shadow refers to one's unique set of traceable digital activities, actions, contributions and communications manifested on the Internet or digital devices. Digital footprints can be classified as either passive or active. The former is composed of a user's web-browsing activity and information stored as cookies. The latter is often released deliberately by a user to share information on websites or social media. While the term usually applies to a person, a digital footprint can also refer to a business, organization or corporation.

The use of a digital footprint has both positive and negative consequences. On one side, it is the subject of many privacy issues. For example, without an individual's authorization, strangers can piece together information about that individual by only using search engines. Corporations are also able to produce customized ads based on browsing history. On the other hand, others can reap the benefits by profiting off their digital footprint as social media influencers. Furthermore, employers use a candidate's digital footprint for online vetting and assessing fit due to its reduced cost and accessibility. Between two equal candidates, a candidate with a positive digital footprint may have an advantage. As technology usage becomes more widespread, even  children generate larger digital footprints with potential positive and negative consequences such as college admissions. Since it is hard not to have a digital footprint, it is in one's best interest to create a positive one.

Types of digital footprints 
Passive digital footprints are a data trail that an individual involuntarily leaves online. They can be stored in various ways depending on the situation. A footprint may be stored in an online database as a "hit" in an online environment. The footprint may track the user's IP address, when it was created, where it came from, and the footprint later being analyzed. In an offline environment, administrators can access and view the machine's actions without seeing who performed them. Examples of passive digital footprints are apps that use geolocations, websites that download cookies onto your appliance, or browser history. Although passive digital footprints are inevitable, they can be lessened by deleting old accounts, using privacy settings (public or private accounts), and occasionally online searching yourself to see the information left behind. 

Active digital footprints are deliberate, as they are posted or shared information willingly. They can also be stored in a variety of ways depending on the situation. A digital footprint can be stored when a user logs into a site and makes a post or change; the registered name is connected to the edit in an online environment. Examples of active digital footprints include social media posts, video or image uploads, or changes to various websites.

Privacy issues 
Digital footprints are not a digital identity or passport, but the content and metadata collected impacts internet privacy, trust, security, digital reputation, and recommendation.  As the digital world expands and integrates with more aspects of life, ownership and rights concerning data become increasingly important.  Digital footprints are controversial in that privacy and openness compete. Scott McNealy, CEO of Sun Microsystems, said in 1999 Get Over It when referring to privacy on the Internet. The quote later became a commonly used phrase in discussing private data and what companies do with it. Digital footprints are a privacy concern because they are a set of traceable actions, contributions, and ideas shared by users. It can be tracked and can allow internet users to learn about human actions.

Interested parties use Internet footprints for several reasons; including cyber-vetting, where interviewers could research applicants based on their online activities.  Internet footprints are also used by law enforcement agencies to provide information unavailable otherwise due to a lack of probable cause. Also, digital footprints are used by marketers to find what products a user is interested in or to inspire ones' interest in a particular product based on similar interests.

Social networking systems may record the activities of individuals, with data becoming a life stream.  Such  social media usage and roaming services allow digital tracing data to include individual interests, social groups, behaviors, and location. Such data is gathered from sensors within devices and collected and analyzed without user awareness. When many users choose to share personal information about themselves through social media platforms, including places they visited, timelines and their connections, they are unaware of the privacy setting choices and the security consequences associated with them. Many social media sites, like Facebook, collect an extensive amount of information that can be used to piece together a user's personality. Information gathered from social media, such as the number of friends a user has, can predict whether or not the user has an introvert or extrovert personality. Moreover, a survey of SNS users revealed that 87% identified their work or education level, 84% identified their full date of birth, 78% identified their location, and 23% listed their phone numbers.

While one's digital footprint may infer personal information, such as demographic traits, sexual orientation, race, religious and political views, personality, or intelligence without individuals' knowledge, it also exposes individuals' private psychological spheres into the social sphere.  Lifelogging is an example of an indiscriminate collection of information concerning an individual's life and behavior. There are actions to take to make a digital footprint challenging to track. An example of the usage or interpretation of data trails is through Facebook-influenced creditworthiness ratings, the judicial investigations around German social scientist Andrej Holm, advertisement-junk mails by the American company OfficeMax or the border incident of Canadian citizen Ellen Richardson.

Impacts

Workforce 
An increasing number of employers are evaluating applicants by their digital footprint through their interaction on social media due to its reduced cost and easy accessibility during the hiring process. By using such resources, employers can gain more insight on candidates beyond their well-scripted interview responses and perfected resumes. Candidates who display poor communication skills, use inappropriate language, or use drugs or alcohol are rated lower. Conversely, a candidate with a professional or family-oriented social media presence receive higher ratings. Employers also assess a candidate through their digital footprint to determine if a candidate is a good cultural fit for their organization. Suppose a candidate upholds an organization's values or shows existing passion for its mission. In that case, the candidate is more likely to integrate within the organization and could accomplish more than the average person. Although these assessments are known not to be accurate predictors of performance or turnover rates, employers still use digital footprints to evaluate their applicants. Thus, job seekers prefer to create a social media presence that would be viewed positively from a professional point of view.

In some professions, maintaining a digital footprint is essential. People will search the internet for specific doctors and their reviews. Half of the search results for a particular physician link to third-party rating websites. For this reason, prospective patients may unknowingly choose their physicians based on their digital footprint in addition to online reviews. Furthermore, a generation relies on social media for livelihood as influencers by using their digital footprint. These influencers have dedicated fan bases that may be eager to follow recommendations. As a result, marketers pay influencers to promote their products among their followers, since this medium may yield better returns than traditional advertising. Consequently, one's career may be reliant on their digital footprint.

Children 

Generation Alpha will not be the first generation born into the internet world. As such, a children's digital footprint is becoming more significant than ever before and their consequences may be unclear. Due to parenting enthusiasm, an increasing amount of parents will create social media accounts for their children at a young age, sometimes even before they are born. Parents may post up to 13,000 photos of a child on social media in their celebratory state before their teen years of everyday life or birthday celebrations. Furthermore, these children are predicted to post 70,000 times online on their own by 18. The advent of posting on social media creates many opportunities to gather data from minors. Since an identity's basic components contain a name, birth date, and address, these children are susceptible to identity theft. While parents may assume that privacy settings may prevent children's photos and data from being exposed, they also have to trust that their followers will not be compromised. Outsiders may take the images to pose as these children's parents or post the content publicly. For example, during the Facebook-Cambridge Analytica data scandal, friends of friends leaked data to data miners. Due presence of children on social media, their privacy may be at risk.

Teenagers 
Some professionals argue that young people entering the workforce should consider the effect of their digital footprint on their marketability and professionalism. Having a digital footprint may be very good for students, as college admissions staff and potential employers may decide to research into prospective student's and employee's online profiles, leading to an enormous impact on the students' futures. Teens will be set up for more success if they consider the kind of impact they are making and how it can affect their future. Instead, someone who acts apathetic towards the impression they are making online will struggle if they one day choose to attend college or enter into the workforce. Teens who plan to receive a higher education will have their digital footprint reviewed and assessed as a part of the application process. Besides, if the teens that have the intention of receiving a higher education are planning to do so with financial help and scholarships, then they need to consider that their digital footprint will be evaluated in the application process to get scholarships.

See also 

 Alternative data
 Behavioral targeting
 Browser isolation
 Data exhaust
 Digital identity
 Internet anonymity
 Internet privacy
 Online advertising
 Online identity
 Reality mining
 Reputation management
 SIGINT
 Social engineering
 Social genome
 Targeted marketing
 UK/USA Agreement
 Universal Product Code
 Web tracking
 Website
 Wire image (networking)

References

Further reading 

 
Computing and society
Digital marketing
Information privacy
Past
Internet privacy